The Neuné is a river which flows in the Vosges department of France. It is a right tributary of the Vologne, and therefore a sub-tributary of the Moselle.

Geography
The Neuné rises within the commune of Gerbépal in the parc naturel régional des Ballons des Vosges, which also contains a part of its length. It flows first to the north-west, then towards the west, and finally towards the south-west where it joins the right bank of the Vologne, at the level of the small settlement of Champ-le-Duc. The Neuné's principal tributary is the B'Heumey, which joins with it in the commune of Chapelle-Devant-Bruyères.

Communes on the course of the Neuné
The Neuné flows through the following communes, from upstream to downstream: Gerbépal, Corcieux, La Houssière, Biffontaine, les Poulières, la Chapelle-devant-Bruyères, Laveline-devant-Bruyères and Champ-le-Duc in the Vosges department.

Nonetheless the communauté de communes du Val de Neuné grouping includes a slightly different set of communes:  Gerbépal, Corcieux, Arrentès-de-Corcieux, La Houssière, Biffontaine, les Poulières, la Chapelle-devant-Bruyères, Vienville.

Hydrology

Le Neuné is a substantial river. Its flow rate has been measured over a 22-year period (1986–2007) at Laveline-devant-Bruyères, which is slightly away from its confluence with the Vologne.

The Neuné exhibits moderate seasonal fluctuations in flow rate. Fluctuations in flow rate can be more significant from year to year and over short time periods.

As for floods, they can also substantial, considering the relatively small watershed. The instantaneous maximum flow rate over 2 years (IMFR2) and the IMFR5 are  respectively. The volumes of the Neuné's floods rise to as much as 30 percent of those of the Vologne.

Comparing the first of these numbers with the different IMFR measurements of the river suggests that this flood was of the order of a 20-year event.

The Neuné is a substantial river. The specific flow rate of the river attaches a solid number to this fact: 23.6 litres per second per square kilometre of basin.

See also

 List of rivers in France

References

External links
 Height of the Neuné at Laveline-devant-Bruyères on the Vigicrues website

Rivers of France
Rivers of Grand Est
Rivers of Vosges (department)